The Church of Sts. Olha and Elizabeth is a Catholic church located in Lviv, Ukraine between the city's main rail station and the Old Town. It was originally built as a Western Catholic church and today serves as a Ukrainian Greek Catholic church.

The church was built by the Latin Archbishop of Lviv Saint Joseph Bilczewski in the years 1903-1911 as a parish church for the city's dynamically developing western suburb. It was designed by Polish architect Teodor Talowski, in the neo-Gothic style, similar to that of the Votive Church in Vienna. St. Elisabeth's, placed on a hill which is the watershed of the Baltic and Black Sea, with its facade flanked by two tall towers and an 85 m belfry on the north side with imposing spires was envisioned as Lviv's first landmark to greet visitors arriving in the city by train.

In 1939 the church was damaged in a bombing raid but remained open until 1946. After the war, the building was used as warehouse and fell further into ruin, until it was returned to faithful with the collapse of the Soviet Union. In 1991 a Ukrainian Greek Catholic was established and the church was reconsecrated as the Church of Sts. Olha and Elizabeth.

Gallery

References 

Churches in Lviv
Roman Catholic churches completed in 1911
Church buildings converted to a different denomination
Roman Catholic churches in Ukraine
Ukrainian Catholic churches in Ukraine
Gothic Revival church buildings in Ukraine
20th-century Roman Catholic church buildings in Ukraine